The Dartmouth Yacht Club is a yacht club located in Wright's Cove in Halifax Harbour's Bedford Basin,  next to  Burnside Industrial Park  in Dartmouth, Nova Scotia, Canada. The club has a history dating to 1962.

Partnerships
The DYC has reciprocal agreements with other yacht clubs, e.g. Britannia Yacht Club.

References

External links
Dartmouth Yacht Club
DYC on Marinas.Com
DYC slideshow on Flickr

Yacht clubs in Canada
Sports venues in Halifax, Nova Scotia
1962 establishments in Nova Scotia
Sports venues completed in 1962